Ishara may refer to:

Ishara, a Hurrian deity
Ishara, a small town in Ogun State in Nigeria
Ishara Nanayakkara, Sri Lankan businessman 
Ishara Yar, a fictional character in Star Trek: The Next Generation

See also
Ishaara (disambiguation)